The Southwestern Baptist Theological Seminary is a Baptist theological institute in  Fort Worth, Texas. It is affiliated with the Southern Baptist Convention. It was established in 1908 and is one of the largest seminaries in the world. It is accredited by the Association of Theological Schools in the United States and Canada, the Southern Association of Colleges and Schools Commission on Colleges, and the National Association of Schools of Music to award diplomas and bachelor's, master's, and doctoral degrees.

History

SWBTS grew out of the Baylor University theological department, which was established in 1901. By 1905, B. H. Carroll had managed to convert the department of five professors into the Baylor Theological Seminary, but still under Baylor University.  In 1907, while Baylor University President Samuel Palmer Brooks was on vacation in Europe, Carroll, then chairman of the Baylor Board of Trustees, made a motion that the department of religion be separated from the university and chartered as a separate entity. The seminary was established in 1908, with Carroll named as its founding president.

The Southwestern Baptist Theological Seminary received its charter on March 14, 1908, but remained on Baylor's Waco campus until the summer of 1910, when the board accepted an offer made by Fort Worth citizens for a campus site and enough funds to build the first building. The  campus was located on what came to be known as "Seminary Hill," one of the highest natural elevations in Tarrant County. The first building was named "Fort Worth Hall" in honor of the seminary's new location. In 1925, the Baptist General Convention of Texas passed control of the seminary to the Southern Baptist Convention.

The Department of Religious Education and the Department of Gospel Music were established within the seminary in 1915. These departments were eventually converted into schools within the seminary in 1921, becoming the School of Gospel Music and the School of Religious Education. As of 2019, the School of Religious Education is now known as the Jack D. Terry School of Educational Ministries, and the School of Gospel Music is now known as the School of Church Music and Worship.

Conservative Resurgence: Russell Dilday's Dismissal and Ken Hemphill’s Election 
In March 1994, the seminary experienced a sudden change in leadership with the dismissal of the seminary's sixth president, Russell H. Dilday, during the Southern Baptist Convention conservative resurgence. On March 9, 1994, the board of trustees voted 26 to 7 to dismiss Dilday after 16-years as seminary president. Dilday was called to a board meeting where he was removed without warning and his office was locked while he was still at the meeting, preventing his removal of personal effects. The Associated Press reported that the newly elected trustee chairman stated that the "institution needed new direction for the 21st century." Students gathered in front of the president's home in protest and support for Dilday. The election of Kenneth S. Hemphill as the seminary's seventh president followed, and he served the seminary from 1994 to 2003.

Recent history (21st century) 
On June 24, 2003, the board of trustees unanimously elected Paige Patterson as the seminary's eighth president. Patterson previously served as president of Southeastern Baptist Theological Seminary for 10 years, thus becoming the second Southern Baptist leader to serve as president for two seminaries within the convention. Patterson also served as the president of the Southern Baptist Convention from 1998 to 2000 and was a leading figure behind the Conservative Resurgence movement within the convention.

In 2006 the seminary imposed a prohibition on professors or administrators promoting charismatic practices, such as private prayer languages.

In 2007 a gender discrimination suit in federal court was filed by Professor Sheri Klouda over her dismissal. Klouda claimed she was dismissed from the faculty due to her gender, being a woman. In response, the seminary commented that Klouda was not dismissed but that she would not have tenure. The Klouda lawsuit was immediately dismissed because of church-state separation-related concerns. The federal judge who dismissed the case stated that "Leaders of a prominent Southern Baptist seminary who believe women are biblically forbidden from teaching men were within their rights when they told a female professor to leave", including a statement that the seminary was well within its First Amendment rights to dismiss Klouda.

In 2014, the school received criticism from other evangelicals when it admitted its first Muslim student from Palestine. The Muslim student was enrolled in Southwestern's PhD program in archaeology. Seminary president Paige Patterson defended his decision to accept the student's application, despite criticism.

The School of Preaching was established in 2015 with David L. Allen serving as the first dean. The purpose of the school is to teach students the importance of text-driven preaching. The seminary added two new graduate programs, Master of Arts in Philosophy and Doctor of Philosophy in World Christian Studies, in 2016. On April 12, 2017, the executive committee reported to the board of trustees that The college at Southwestern would be renamed in honor of the seminary's second president Lee Rutland Scarborough, becoming the L.R. Scarborough College.

In May, Patterson was criticized for his comments and views on women and sexual harassment. On May 22, 2018, after a 13-hour discussion with the trustee board of Southwestern, Patterson was appointed President Emeritus. On May 30, however, the executive committee of the Southwestern trustees voted to remove all benefits provided to Patterson, including the title of President Emeritus.  Patterson was immediately fired from SWBTS. D. Jeffrey Bingham, dean of the School of Theology, was subsequently appointed interim president.

On February 27, 2019, Adam W. Greenway was elected by the board of trustees as the ninth president of the seminary. He was the first alumnus since Russell Dilday to serve as president, having earned his Master of Divinity degree from Southwestern Seminary in 2002. Greenway had previously served as dean of the Billy Graham School of Missions, Evangelism and Ministry at Southern Baptist Theological Seminary in Louisville, Kentucky.

After Greenway’s resignation, Dr. David S. Dockery, also an alumnus, was called as interim president on September 27, 2022.

Presidents

Administration and faculty
SWBTS is currently administered by a 40-member board of trustees serving staggered terms of office. Board members are elected by the Southern Baptist Convention. Trustees elect faculty members and administrative officers. Financial support is derived from the Southern Baptist Convention's Cooperative Program, endowment earnings, gifts and student fees.

Dr. Adam W. Greenway was the ninth president of the seminary. The full-time faculty includes approximately seventy individuals with nearly twice as many part-time and adjunct faculty members.

Academics
Aside from theology, the school offers a wide variety of graduate majors such as apologetics, biblical counseling, Christian education, divinity, Islamic studies, missiology, and music.

Since 1908, Southwestern Seminary has graduated more than 44,000 students. Southwestern's current student body represents 46 states and 45 countries. The seminary's academic journal, Southwestern Journal of Theology has been published since 1958. It is conservative and Baptist in orientation.

In the fall of 2005, the seminary converted its undergraduate program into the L.R. Scarborough College, later renamed Texas Baptist College. In 2007 the seminary began an initiative for engaging and transforming culture, its new Center for Cultural Engagement, named in honor of Richard Land. In line with this initiative, the seminary employed prominent intelligent design advocate William A. Dembski. In 2016, the seminary added a master's degree program in Philosophy. The program was approved by the board of trustees and, in January 2017, by the accreditation body, the Association of Theological Schools (ATS). Southwestern's then President, Paige Patterson, stated Everybody is a philosopher, the question is are you a good one or a bad one? We are committed to having good philosophers and to making good thinkers and philosophers out of our people.

Southwestern is divided into six schools:

 The School of Theology
 The School of Church Music and Worship
 The Jack D. Terry School of Educational Ministries
 The Roy J. Fish School of Evangelism and Missions
 The Texas Baptist College

School of Theology
Established in 1908, the School of Theology trains seminary student for master's or doctorate degrees in theology. Concentrations include biblical languages, apologetics, theology, church history, preaching, pastoral ministry, etc. Students are able to obtain a master's or doctoral degree designed as an entrypoint into Christian ministry in a variety of contexts. The current interim dean is W. Madison Grace II.

School of Church Music and Worship
Originally a department within the School of Theology, the School of Gospel Music was established in 1921. The school was renamed to the School of Sacred Music in 1926, a name which it bore until 1957 when the school was renamed the School of Church Music. In 2019, the school was renamed the School of Church Music and Worship. The current dean of the school is Joseph R. Crider.

Jack D. Terry School of Educational Ministries
The Terry School of Educational Ministries offers several different master's and doctoral degrees such as the Master of Arts in Christian Education (MACE). The school was originally a department within the School of Theology until the School of Religious Education was established in 1921. The school was renamed to the School of Educational Ministries in 1997. The school was officially renamed in 2009 in honor of Jack D. Terry. Current concentrations provided in this school include biblical counseling, children's ministry, collegiate ministry, and student ministries. The current dean is Chris Shirley.

Roy J. Fish School of Evangelism and Missions 
In 2005, the division of evangelism and missions in the School of Theology was reorganized as the Roy J. Fish School of Evangelism and Missions. This division provides students with spiritual mentorship, a solid theological grounding in Scripture, and coursework that equips them to share the Gospel with intelligence, relevance and boldness. The current dean is John D. Massey.

Religious beliefs
The Baptist Faith and Message (2000) is the seminary's confessional statement (see the Southwestern Declaration on Academic and Theological Integrity). The Chicago Statement on Biblical Inerrancy and the Danvers Statement on Biblical Manhood and Womanhood provide further interpretive guidance related to the seminary's doctrinal positions on the nature of biblical inspiration and gender roles, respectively.

Extension Campuses
Southwestern Baptist Theological Seminary has its main campus in Fort Worth, but also offers programs and selected degrees at remote campuses. 
Master of Arts in theology (Bonn, Germany)

Notable people

Faculty

Alumni
SWBTS includes many notable and well known alumni including several different Southern Baptist Convention Presidents, a U.S Senator, a US Governor, U.S. presidential candidates, members of the White House Cabinet of the United States, seminary presidents, pastors, educators, theologians, Civil Rights activists, songwriters, authors, etc.

References

External links
Official website

Seminaries and theological colleges in Texas
Baptist seminaries and theological colleges affiliated with the Southern Baptist Convention
Universities and colleges in Fort Worth, Texas
Universities and colleges accredited by the Southern Association of Colleges and Schools
Educational institutions established in 1901
Evangelicalism in Texas
1901 establishments in Texas